Clássica Loulé is a men's one-day cycle race which takes place in Portugal. It was rated by the UCI as 1.2 and forms part of the UCI Europe Tour.

Overall winners

References

Cycle races in Portugal
Sport in Loulé
Spring (season) events in Portugal